Trish Summerville is an American costume designer. She is best known for her work on Francis Lawrence's dystopian science fiction film The Hunger Games: Catching Fire (2013), as well as her collaborations with David Fincher including his psychological thriller films; The Girl with the Dragon Tattoo (2011), Gone Girl (2014), and his black-and-white biographical drama film Mank (2020), for which she was nominated for both an Academy Award for Best Costume Design and BAFTA Award for Best Costume Design. Summerville was also nominated for an Primetime Emmy Award in the category Outstanding Period Costumes for her work on the television program Westworld.

Film credits

References

External links 

Living people
Place of birth missing (living people)
Year of birth missing (living people)
American costume designers
Women costume designers